Helena Pajovic (November 7, 1979 in Belgrade, Yugoslavia – December 24, 2000) was a Serb figure skater who competed internationally for Yugoslavia. She was a three-time competitor at the World Figure Skating Championships and a two-time competitor at the European Figure Skating Championships. She was killed in a car accident in 2000, on her way home from Skate Israel, where she won the bronze medal. In 2001, the Serbian Skating Federation created the Helena Pajovic Cup competition in her memory.

References
 Serbia and Montenegro Skating Federation: Helena Pajovic
 Skatabase: 1990s Worlds
 Skatabase: 2000 Worlds
 Skatabase: 1990s Europeans
 Skatabase: 2000 Europeans

Serbian female single skaters
Yugoslav female single skaters
1979 births
2000 deaths
Sportspeople from Belgrade
Road incident deaths in Yugoslavia